Lončar is a Serbian, Montenegrin, Croatian and Slovenian surname, meaning "potter".

It is among the most common surnames in the Koprivnica-Križevci County of Croatia.

It may refer to:

Alen Lončar (born 1974), retired male freestyle swimmer from Croatia
Beba Lončar (born 1943), Serbian-Italian film actress
Dragotin Lončar (1876–1954), Slovenian historian, editor and Social Democratic politician
Krešimir Lončar (born 1983), 6 ft 10¾ in Croatian professional basketball player
Nikola Lončar (born 1972), retired Serbian professional basketball player
Rade Lončar (born 1996), Serbian professional basketball player
Stefan Lončar (born 1996), Montenegrin footballer
Stjepan Lončar (born 1996), Bosnian-Herzegovinian professional footballer
Zlatibor Lončar (born 1971), Health Minister of Serbia
Zoran Lončar (born 1965), the former Serbian Minister of Education and Minister of Public Administration and Local Self-Government
Zoran Lončar (footballer) (born 1966), Serbian former football forward

References

Serbian surnames
Croatian surnames
Slovene-language surnames
Occupational surnames